Niue High School (Mata Ki Luga) is a secondary school in Alofi, the capital city of Niue. It is located on the Alofi-Liku Road and, as of 2010, has 175 students in attendance. The school caters for years 7 to 13 (ages 11–18). Within the school is the Paliati Grounds, which reportedly has a capacity of 1,000 and is where Niuean association football teams play.

In 1993, Terry Coe, a former principal Niue High School, was elected to the Niue Assembly.

Anti-bullying campaign 
The school is also has an anti-bullying campaign, which has been around since 2002. It focuses on bullying along with human rights.

References

Alofi